Nelkan is the name of several inhabited localities in Russia.

Urban localities
Nelkan, Sakha Republic, a settlement in Oymyakonsky District of the Sakha Republic

Rural localities
Nelkan, Khabarovsk Krai, a selo in Ayano-Maysky District of Khabarovsk Krai